David Kašnik (born 16 January 1987) is a Slovenian footballer who plays as a defender for Austrian side USV Wies.

Club career
Kašnik started his career in Dravograd, and played as a forward and a midfielder in his younger days. When he was 14 years old, a serious knee injury prevented him from playing football for a year and a half. He fully recovered and moved to Olimpija Ljubljana after an initial trial. He signed a contract in August 2008.

He rarely played in his first season when Olimpija won the second division. During the summer of 2009 the majority of the experienced players left the club and Kašnik found himself in the first team.

References

External links
NZS profile 

1987 births
Living people
Sportspeople from Slovenj Gradec
Slovenian footballers
Association football defenders
NK Dravograd players
NK Olimpija Ljubljana (2005) players
Sheffield Wednesday F.C. players
NK Aluminij players
NK Rudar Velenje players
NK Fužinar players
Slovenian Second League players
Slovenian PrvaLiga players
Slovenian expatriate footballers
Expatriate footballers in England
Slovenian expatriate sportspeople in England
Expatriate footballers in Austria
Slovenian expatriate sportspeople in Austria